The Mena Kansas City-Southern Depot is a historic railroad station on Sherwood Street in the center of Mena, Arkansas.  It is long single-story structure, built out of brick, with a tile roof and Mediterranean styling.  It was built in 1920 by the Kansas City Southern Railway to designs by the company architect, T. C. Horstmann, and is one of the most elaborate surviving early-20th century railroad stations in the state.  It is now owned by the city, and houses a local history museum and the local chamber of commerce.

The station was listed on the National Register of Historic Places in 1991.

See also
National Register of Historic Places listings in Polk County, Arkansas

References

External links
Depot - City of Mena

Railway stations on the National Register of Historic Places in Arkansas
Railway stations in the United States opened in 1920
Transportation in Polk County, Arkansas
Museums in Polk County, Arkansas
National Register of Historic Places in Polk County, Arkansas
Historic district contributing properties in Arkansas
Kansas City Southern Railway stations
Former railway stations in Arkansas